François Poeydebasque (7 January 1891 - 21 September 1914) was a rugby union player who represented France twice, at home to Ireland and away to Wales in 1914. He played as a centre and as a scrum-half for Rowing Bayonnais. He was killed in the First World War.

References

French military personnel killed in World War I
1914 deaths
Place of birth missing
French rugby union players
1891 births
Rugby union fly-halves
Rugby union centres
France international rugby union players